The James Norman Hall House is a historic residence located in Colfax, Iowa, United States.  This was an early home of author James Norman Hall. His first book was written here, and it figured into his other works, notably Oh Millersburg!  He is best known as a co-author of the 1932 novel Mutiny on The Bounty.  Most of Hall's life, however, was lived outside of Colfax and the United States in his later years.  The two-story, frame house, follows an L-plan.  There is a single story wrap around porch on the west, south and half of the southeast sides.  It was listed on the National Register of Historic Places in 1984.

References

Houses completed in 1887
Houses in Jasper County, Iowa
National Register of Historic Places in Jasper County, Iowa
Houses on the National Register of Historic Places in Iowa
Museums dedicated to James Norman Hall
Homes of American writers